Triroetus is a genus of proetid trilobite found in Upper Carboniferous-aged marine strata in Russia, and Lower Permian-aged strata of Thailand, Malaysia, Spitzbergen, Yukon Territory, and Middle Permian-aged marine strata of Oman and Texas.

References 

Carboniferous trilobites
Permian trilobites
Carboniferous first appearances
Permian genus extinctions
Permian animals of Asia
Philipsidae
Paleozoic life of Yukon